Sunguvarchathram is a town, suburb of Chennai City and Kancheepuram District, Tamil Nadu. It falls under Chennai Metropolitan Area.
Cities and towns in Kanchipuram district